Alice Kate Aparri (born 1984 or 1985) is a Filipino light flyweight amateur boxer.

Aparri represented the Philippines in South East Asian Games for four events.

References

1980s births
Living people
Filipino women boxers
Southeast Asian Games medalists in boxing
Southeast Asian Games gold medalists for the Philippines
Southeast Asian Games competitors for the Philippines
Southeast Asian Games silver medalists for the Philippines
Competitors at the 2005 Southeast Asian Games
Competitors at the 2007 Southeast Asian Games
Competitors at the 2009 Southeast Asian Games
Competitors at the 2011 Southeast Asian Games
Flyweight boxers